Eve-Olution is the third studio album by American rapper Eve. It was released by Ruff Ryders Entertainment on August 27, 2002, distributed through Interscope Records. Production was handled by frequent collaborators Dr. Dre, Swizz Beatz and also Irv Gotti, among others. The album garnered the internationally successful single "Gangsta Lovin'", which reached number two on the Billboard Hot 100 and R&B/Hip-Hop song charts as well as number four in Australia. The album debuted at number six on the Billboard 200 with first-week sales 133,000	copies. It reached the top twenty in Canada, France, and Switzerland. The album has sold over 600,000 copies in the US and was certified gold in sales by the Recording Industry Association of America (RIAA).

Critical reception

In a positive review, Entertainment Weekly writer said that Eve-Olution is a "more complex and sophisticated sound that dexterously mixes up moods and tones." He also stated that "instead of the record coming off like a pu-pu platter -- a little R&B from column A, a little pop from column B -- it maintains its focus, making it a wholly satisfying experience." Hope Gonzalez of IGN called the album a "smorgasbord of beats" because it "dapples in soul, electronic, and even salsa music to create yet another opus of hip-pop jingles." She also said "Gangsta Lovin'" is "quite different" from most of the tracks on the album because it is "the most radio-friendly track on the album."

Slant Magazines Sal Cinquemani said "Eve fares better when the rhythms are sexy and the rhymes are slick". AllMusic noted that the "focus here is less hip-hop and more contemporary R&B, with fewer rappers invited as guests". He dismissed the songs "What" and "Gangsta Lovin'" as "surprisingly mediocre", adding that the guest vocalists are "vamping over bland choruses and Eve contributing only a few good rhymes." He compared the album to Eve's previous releases and claimed "Eve-Olution can't offer as much as either of her first two solid LPs." In contrast, Cinquemani said that "Eve's Eve-Olution might not change the order of the hip-hop food chain as we know it but it's another tight record that will undoubtedly keep her, um, rydin' high."

Singles
"Gangsta Lovin'" was released in September 2002 as the first single from the album. In the United States, it peaked at number two on both the Billboard Hot 100 (becoming Eve's second highest-charting song on the chart) and R&B/Hip-Hop Songs charts while it reached number four in Australia. The song had moderate success in Austria, peaking at number forty-one. It peaked inside the top twenty in most countries such as Norway, New Zealand, Belgium, the UK and Switzerland, among others.

"Satisfaction" was released as the second and final single from the album in late March 2003. It saw moderate success in the US, reaching at number twenty-seven on the Billboard Hot 100 chart and number twenty-two on the R&B/Hip-Hop chart. It debuted inside the top twenty in the UK, and dropped off the chart after four weeks. It was a minor hit in the Netherlands, only peaked at number eighty-seven.

Track listing

Sample credits
"Gangsta Lovin'" contains elements from "Don't Stop the Music" as written by Alisa Yarbrough, Jonah Ellis, an Lonnie Simmons. 
"Double R What" contains a sample of "P.S.K. What Does It Mean" as written by Jesse Weaver, Jr.

Personnel

Dee Dean –, executive producer
Waah Dean – executive producer
Eve – producer, executive producer
Jay "Icepick" Jackson – arranger, executive producer, producer
Steve Stout – production executive
Drew Fitzgerald – creative director
Larry Chatman – project coordinator
Ekaterina Kenney – creative assistance
Dr. Dre – producer, mixing
Mike Elizondo – producer, guitar, keyboard, bass
Irv Gotti – producer
Hot Runner – producer
Neckbones – producer
Poke & Tone – producer
Staxx – producer
Swizz Beatz – producer

Teflon – producer, additional vocals
Larry Phillabaum – guitar, keyboards, mixing
Steve Baughman – mixing
Barry Goldstein – mixing
Rich Keller – mixing
Doug Wilson – mixing
Brian Springer – mixing
Gabe Chiesa – engineer
Carlisle Young – engineer, vocal engineer
Tom Rounds – assistant engineer
Sam Story – assistant engineer
Tony Dawsey – mastering
Anthony Hamilton - vocals
Tracie Spencer – background vocals
Joe Zee – stylist
Alexander Allen – stylist
Michael Hart Thompson – photography
Richard Page – make-up

Charts

Weekly charts

Year-end charts

Certifications

Release history

References

2002 albums
Eve (rapper) albums
Albums produced by Dr. Dre
Albums produced by Irv Gotti
Albums produced by Scott Storch
Albums produced by Swizz Beatz
Albums produced by Mike Elizondo
Albums produced by Bink (record producer)
Interscope Records albums
Interscope Geffen A&M Records albums
Ruff Ryders Entertainment albums